Ian Cheshire may refer to:

 Ian Cheshire (engineer) (born 1936), Scottish petroleum engineer
 Ian Cheshire (businessman) (born 1959), British businessman